A number of steamships were named Medea, including:

 , a Dutch cargo ship torpedoed and sunk in 1942
 , a French coastal tanker in service 1946–51

Ship names